GWA Group Limited (formerly Great Western  Australia Ltd.)() is an Australian company that distributes household consumer products and was listed on the Australian Stock Exchange in May 1993. GWA closed its last remaining factory in 2017. This signaled the company's move from being a manufacturer to a purely import-based model.

As of 2018 the company has approximately 757 employees, down from 1,680 employees in 2014. It sold its Dux Hot Water brand to the Tokyo-listed Noritz Corporation for $46 million in 2014.

Brands
Caroma is a designer, importer and distributor of domestic and commercial sanitaryware and bathroom products. 
Dorf Clark is a principal designer, importer and distributor of tapware and associated accessories, stainless steel sinks and laundry tubs for both domestic and commercial applications.
Methven was a New Zealand manufactured tapware and shower company. They were acquired by GWA in 2019.

Former Brands
Gainsborough is an Australian designer, manufacturer, importer and distributor of a comprehensive range of domestic and commercial door hardware and fittings, including security products. GWA Door Hardware, including Gainsborough, API Locksmith and Austral Lock among others, was divested to Allegion in 2018.
Gliderol is a manufacturer and distributor of garage and industrial doors, motors, and gate opening motors, and devices. Only the Australian name and market was purchased from the owners in 2011 not the international rights. Gliderol Garage Doors business was sold to Reliance Doors in July 2015.
 EcoSmart manufactures solar power equipment and solar water heaters. Divested, along with Dux hot water, to Japanese company Noritz.
 Brivis air conditioning divested to Rinnai.
 Hansa tapware divested to Argent.

References

External links

 GWA sells Dux Hot Water to Japan’s Noritz
 GWA Group Limited
 Dux Hot Water
 EcoSmart

Manufacturing companies of Australia
Companies listed on the Australian Securities Exchange